Cambiano is a comune (municipality) in the Metropolitan City of Turin in the Italian region Piedmont, located about  southeast of Turin.

Cambiano borders the following municipalities: Pino Torinese, Chieri, Pecetto Torinese, Moncalieri, Trofarello, Santena, and Villastellone.

Twin towns — sister cities
Cambiano is twinned with:

  Aquilonia, Italy
  Monteverde, Italy

References

External links
 Official website

Cities and towns in Piedmont